is a Japanese professional golfer.

Yamada played on the Japan Golf Tour, winning twice.

Professional wins (2)

Japan Golf Tour wins (2)

*Note: The 1975 Golf Digest Tournament was shortened to 63 holes due to Thyphoon Cora.

Team appearances
Amateur
Eisenhower Trophy (representing Japan): 1968, 1970

External links

Japanese male golfers
Japan Golf Tour golfers
Sportspeople from Tokyo
1947 births
Living people